Ardechive is a small crofting hamlet, located on the shores of Loch Arkaig, close to Achnasaul and Spean Bridge, county of Inverness-shire, Scotland, within the Scottish council area of Highland.

References

Populated places in Lochaber